Stettin was the name of a number of steamships.

, a German cargo ship
, a German cargo ship
, a German cargo ship
, a German icebreaker

Ship names